Jonnie Luigi Fedel (born 22 November 1966) is a Swedish former professional footballer who played as a goalkeeper. He serves as a goalkeeping coach for Allsvenskan club Malmö FF. He spent almost his entire playing career at Malmö FF.

International career 
Fedel won two caps for the Sweden national team, making his debut in 1992 in a friendly game against Australia. He won his second cap in a friendly game against South Korea in 1996, replacing Bengt Andersson in goal at half time.

Career statistics

Honours 
Malmö FF

 Swedish Champion: 1986, 1988
 Svenska Cupen: 1985–86, 1988–89

References

External sources
 Malmö FF profile 
 

1966 births
Living people
Swedish people of Italian descent
Swedish footballers
Footballers from Skåne County
Association football goalkeepers
Sweden international footballers
Allsvenskan players
Superettan players
Malmö FF players
Swedish football managers
Allsvenskan managers